Andy Beckwith is an English actor.

Career
He is best known for his role as Errol in Guy Ritchie's Snatch (2000) and for his portrayal of Rorge in the HBO series Game of Thrones (2012–2014). He played the role of Clanker, a member of the Flying Dutchman's crew in the Pirates of the Caribbean franchise.

He has appeared in numerous British television and film projects, including feature films Hell to Pay (2005) and Ironclad: Battle for Blood (2014), and TV series such as EastEnders, By Any Means and Grantchester. He featured as a blind footballer in Bury It, a 2002 comedy short with Des McAleer, Clare Grogan and Steve Sweeney.

Filmography

Film

Television

References

External links
 
 

Living people
20th-century English male actors
21st-century English male actors
English male film actors
English male television actors
Year of birth missing (living people)